Shakira Isabel Mebarak Ripoll (born 2 February 1977) is a Colombian singer and songwriter. Born and raised in Barranquilla, she has been referred to as the "Queen of Latin Music" and is noted for her musical versatility. She made her recording debut with Sony Music Colombia at the age of 13. Following the commercial failure of her first two albums, Magia (1991) and Peligro (1993), she rose to prominence in Hispanic countries with her next albums, Pies Descalzos (1995) and Dónde Están los Ladrones? (1998). She entered the English-language market with her fifth album, Laundry Service (2001), which sold over 13 million copies worldwide. Buoyed by the international success of her singles "Whenever, Wherever" and "Underneath Your Clothes", the album propelled her reputation as a leading crossover artist. Broadcast Music, Inc., described Shakira as a "pioneer" who extended the global reach of Latino singers.

Her success was further solidified with the Spanish albums Fijación Oral, Vol. 1 (2005), Sale el Sol (2010), and El Dorado (2017), all of which topped the Billboard Top Latin Albums chart and were certified diamond (Latin) by  the Recording Industry Association of America. Meanwhile, her English albums Oral Fixation, Vol. 2 (2005), She Wolf (2009) and Shakira (2014) were all certified gold, platinum, or multi-platinum in various countries worldwide. Some of her songs have charted at number one in multiple countries, including "Whenever, Wherever", La Tortura", "Hips Don't Lie", "Beautiful Liar", "Waka Waka (This Time for Africa)", "Loca", "Can't Remember to Forget You", "Chantaje", "Bzrp Music Sessions, Vol. 53", and "TQG". She served as a coach on two seasons of the American singing competition television series The Voice (2013–2014).

With a catalog of 145 songs, Shakira has sold over 85 million records, making her one of the best-selling music artists of all time. Forbes Colombia reported that as of 2018, she is the top-selling female Latin artist of all time. She is credited with opening the doors of the international market for other Latin artists. She has received numerous awards, including three Grammy Awards, twelve Latin Grammy Awards, four MTV Video Music Awards, seven Billboard Music Awards, thirty-nine Billboard Latin Music Awards, twenty-one Guinness World Records, and a star on the Hollywood Walk of Fame. She was named the Top Female Latin Artist of the Decade by Billboard twice (2000s and 2010s). For her philanthropic work with her Barefoot Foundation and her contributions to music she received the Latin Recording Academy Person of the Year and Harvard Foundation Artist of the Year awards in 2011. She was appointed to the President's Advisory Commission on Educational Excellence for Hispanics in the US in 2011, and Chevalier of the Order of Arts and Letters by the French government in 2012.

Early life
Shakira Isabel Mebarak Ripoll was born on 2 February 1977 in Barranquilla, Colombia. She is the only child of William Mebarak Chadid and Nidia Ripoll Torrado. She is a Colombian of Lebanese descent. Her father William was born in New York City to a family from Lebanon. When he was five, his family moved to Colombia. Her Colombian mother's side has two Spanish surnames, Ripoll and Torrado, the former of which is Catalan and originates from four brothers who immigrated from Catalonia to coastal Colombia in the 19th century. She has also claimed to have distant Italian roots through an ancestor with the surname "Pisciotti". She was raised Catholic and attended Catholic schools. She has eight older half-siblings from her father's previous marriage. Shakira spent much of her youth in Barranquilla, a city located on the northern Caribbean coast of Colombia.

Shakira wrote her first poem, titled "La rosa de cristal" ('The Crystal Rose'), when she was only four years old. As she was growing up, she was fascinated watching her father writing stories on a typewriter, and asked for one as a Christmas gift. She got that typewriter at age seven, and has continued writing poetry since then. These poems eventually evolved into songs. When Shakira was two years old, an older half-brother was killed in a motorcycle accident; six years later, at age eight, Shakira wrote her first song, titled "Tus gafas oscuras" ('Your dark glasses'), which was inspired by her father, who for years wore dark glasses to hide his grief.

When Shakira was four, her father took her to a local Middle Eastern restaurant, where Shakira first heard the doumbek, a traditional drum used in Middle-Eastern music and which typically accompanied belly dancing. She started dancing on the table, and the experience made her realize that she wanted to be a performer. She enjoyed singing for schoolmates and teachers (and even the nuns) at her Catholic school, but in second grade, she was rejected for the school choir because her vibrato was too strong. The music teacher told her that she sounded "like a goat". At school, she was often sent out of the class because of her hyperactivity. She says she had also been known as "the belly dancer girl", as she would demonstrate every Friday at school a number she had learned. "That's how I discovered my passion for live performance," she says.
To instill gratitude in Shakira for her upbringing, her father took her to a local park to see orphans who lived there. The images stayed with her, and she said to herself: "One day I'm going to help these kids when I become a famous artist."

Between ages ten and thirteen, Shakira was invited to various events in Barranquilla and gained some recognition in the area. It was at this approximate time that she met local theater producer Monica Ariza, who was impressed with her and as a result tried to help her career. During a flight from Barranquilla to Bogotá, Ariza convinced Sony Colombia executive Ciro Vargas to hold an audition for Shakira in a hotel lobby. Vargas held Shakira in high regard and, returning to the Sony office, gave the cassette to a song and artist director. However, the director was not overly excited and thought Shakira was something of "a lost cause". Undaunted and still convinced that Shakira had talent, Vargas set up an audition in Bogotá. He arranged for Sony Colombia executives to arrive at the audition, with the idea of surprising them with Shakira's performance. She performed three songs for the executives and impressed them enough for her to be signed to record three albums.

Career

1990–1995: Beginnings
Shakira's debut album, Magia, was recorded with Sony Music Colombia in 1990 when she was only 13 years old. The songs are a collection made by her since she was eight, mixed pop-rock ballads and disco uptempo songs with electronic accompaniment. The album was released in June 1991 and featured "Magia" and three other singles. Though it fared well on Colombian radio and gave the young Shakira much exposure, the album did not fare well commercially, as only 1,200 copies were sold worldwide. After the poor performance of Magia, Shakira's label urged her to return to the studio to release a follow-up record. Though she was little known outside of her native Colombia at the time, Shakira was invited to perform at Chile's Viña del Mar International Song Festival in February 1993. The festival gave aspiring Latin American singers a chance to perform their songs, and the winner was then chosen by a panel of judges. Shakira performed the ballad "Eres" ("You Are") and won the trophy for third place. One of the judges who voted for her to win was the then 20-year-old Ricky Martin, whose initial prominence had come from his membership in Menudo.

Shakira's second studio album, titled Peligro, was released in March, but Shakira was not pleased with the final result, mainly taking issue with the production. The album was better received than Magia had been, though it was also considered a commercial failure due to Shakira's refusal to advertise or promote it. Shakira then decided to take a hiatus from recording so that she could graduate from high school. In the same year, Shakira starred in the Colombian TV series The Oasis, loosely based on the Armero tragedy in 1985. Since then, the albums have been pulled from release and are not considered official Shakira albums but rather promotional albums.

1995–2000: Latin breakthrough
Shakira originally recorded the song "¿Dónde Estás Corazón?" (later released on her album Pies Descalzos) for the compilation album Nuestro Rock in 1994, released exclusively in Colombia. The song was an instant success on radio stations in Colombia and Sony decided to finance her third record, by giving her the last chance due to previous commercial failures.

Shakira returned to recording music under Sony Music along with Columbia Records in 1995 with Luis F. Ochoa, using musical influences from a number of countries and an Alanis Morissette-oriented persona which affected two of her next albums.  These recordings spawned her third studio album, and her international debut album, titled Pies Descalzos. Recording for the album began in February 1995, after the success of her single "¿Dónde Estás Corazón?".

The album, Pies Descalzos, was released in October 1995 in the Latin American countries and in February 1996 in the US. It reached number five on the U.S. Billboard Top Latin Albums chart. The album spawned six hit singles, "Estoy Aquí", which reached number two on the U.S. Latin chart, "¿Dónde Estás Corazón?" which reached number five on the U.S. Latin chart, "Pies Descalzos, Sueños Blancos" which reached number 11 on the U.S. Latin chart, "Un Poco de Amor" which reached number six on the U.S. Latin chart, "Antología" which reached number 15 on the U.S. Latin chart, and "Se Quiere, Se Mata" which reached number eight on the U.S. Latin chart. In August 1996, RIAA certified the album platinum status.

In March 1996, Shakira went on to her first international tour, named simply the Tour Pies Descalzos. The tour consisted of 20 shows and ended in 1997. Also in that year, Shakira received three Billboard Latin Music Awards for Album of the Year for Pies Descalzos, Video of the Year for "Estoy Aqui", and Best New Artist. Pies Descalzos later sold over 5 million copies, prompting the release of a remix album, simply titled The Remixes. The Remixes also included Portuguese versions of some of her well-known songs, which were recorded as a result of her success in the Brazilian market, where Pies Descalzos sold nearly one million copies.

Her fourth studio album was titled Dónde Están los Ladrones? Produced by Shakira with Emilio Estefan, Jr. as the executive producer it was released in September 1998. The album, inspired by an incident in an airport in which a suitcase filled with her written lyrics was stolen, became a bigger hit than Pies Descalzos. The album has reached a peak position of number 131 on the U.S. Billboard 200 and held the top spot on the U.S. Latin Albums chart for 11 weeks. It has since sold over 7 million copies worldwide and 1.5 million copies in the U.S. alone, making it one of the best selling Spanish albums in the U.S. Eight singles were taken from the album including "Ciega, Sordomuda", "Moscas En La Casa", "No Creo", "Inevitable", "Tú", "Si Te Vas", "Octavo día", and "Ojos Así".

Shakira also received her first Grammy Award nomination in 1999 for the Grammy Award for Best Latin Rock or Alternative Album. Shakira's first live album, MTV Unplugged, was recorded in New York City on 12 August 1999. Highly acclaimed by American critics, it is rated as one of her best-ever live performances. In March 2000, Shakira embarked on her Tour Anfibio, a two-month tour of Latin America and the United States. In August 2000, she won an MTV Video Music Award in the category of People's Choice – Favorite International Artist for "Ojos Así". In September 2000, Shakira performed "Ojos Así" at the inaugural ceremony of the Latin Grammy Awards, where she was nominated in five categories: Album of the Year and Best Pop Vocal Album for MTV Unplugged, Best Female Rock Vocal Performance for "Octavo Día", Best Female Pop Vocal Performance and Best Short Form Music Video for the video for "Ojos Así".

2001–2004: English transition with Laundry Service
Upon the success of Dónde Están los Ladrones? and MTV Unplugged, Shakira began working on an English crossover album. She learned English with the help of Gloria Estefan. She worked for over a year on new material for the album. "Whenever, Wherever", called "Suerte" in Spanish-speaking countries, was released as the first and lead single from her first English album and fifth studio album throughout the period between August 2001 and February 2002. The song took heavy influence from Andean music, including the charango and panpipes in its instrumentation. It became an international success by reaching number one in most countries. It was also her first success in the U.S., by reaching number six on the Hot 100.

Shakira's fifth studio album and first English language album, titled Laundry Service in English-speaking countries and Servicio De Lavanderia in Latin America and Spain, was released on 13 November 2001. The album debuted at number three on the U.S. Billboard 200 chart, selling over 200,000 records in its first week. The album was later certified triple platinum by the RIAA in June 2004 as well. It helped to establish Shakira's musical presence in the mainstream North American market. Seven singles were taken from the album such as "Whenever, Wherever"/"Suerte", "Underneath Your Clothes", "Objection (Tango)"/"Te Aviso, Te Anuncio (Tango)", "The One", "Te Dejo Madrid", "Que Me Quedes Tú", and "Poem to a Horse".

Because the album was created for the English-language market, the rock and Spanish dance-influenced album gained mild critical success, with some critics claiming that her English skills were too weak for her to write songs for it; Rolling Stone, for one, stated that "she sounds downright silly" or "Shakira's magic is lost in translation". A similar view was expressed by Elizabeth Mendez Berry in Vibe: "While her Spanish-language albums sparkled with elegant wordplay, this record is rife with cliches, both musically and lyrically. [...] For Anglophone Latin lovers, Shakira's lyrics are best left to the imagination." Despite this fact, the album became the best selling album of 2002, selling more than 13 million copies worldwide. and became the most successful album of her career to date. The album earned her the title as the biggest Latin female crossover artist in the world. Around this time, Shakira also released four songs for Pepsi for her promotion in the English markets: "Ask for More", "Pide Más", "Knock on My Door", and "Pídeme el Sol". In Chicago Tribune, journalist Joshua Klein defined her international ascent "as multilateral, multicultural and cooperative as they come."

In 2002, at Aerosmith's MTV Icon in April 2002, Shakira performed "Dude (Looks Like a Lady)". She also joined Cher, Whitney Houston, Celine Dion, Mary J. Blige, Anastacia, and the Dixie Chicks for VH1 Divas Live Las Vegas. In August, she performed "Objection (Tango)" at the 2002 MTV Video Music Awards, and won the International Viewer's Choice Award with "Whenever, Wherever". She also won the Latin Grammy Award for the category of Best Short Form Music Video for the Spanish version of the video. In October, she won five MTV Video Music Awards Latin America for Best Female Artist, Best Pop Artist, Best Artist – North (Region), Video of the Year (for "Suerte"), and Artist of the Year. In November, she embarked on the Tour of the Mongoose with 61 shows occurring by May 2003. The tour was also her first worldwide tour, as legs were played in North America, South America, Europe and Asia. Shakira's label, Sony BMG, also released her Spanish greatest-hits compilation, Grandes Éxitos. A DVD and 10-track live album, titled Live & Off the Record, was also released in 2004, commemorating the Tour of the Mongoose.

2005–2007: Fijación Oral, Volumen Uno and Oral Fixation, Volume Two
Shakira's sixth studio album, Fijación Oral, Volumen Uno, was released in June 2005. The lead single from the album, "La Tortura", reached the top 40 on the Hot 100. The song also featured the Spanish balladeer Alejandro Sanz. Shakira; Sanz and Daddy Yankee ("Gasolina") were the first artists to perform Spanish language songs at the 2005 MTV Video Music Awards. The album was extremely well received. It debuted at number four on the Billboard 200 chart, selling 157,000 copies in its first week. It has since sold over two million copies in the U.S., earning an 11× Platinum (Latin field) certification from the RIAA. Due to its first week sales, the album became the highest debut ever for a Spanish language album. After only a day of release in Latin America, the album earned certifications. In Venezuela, it earned a Platinum certification, in Colombia, a triple Platinum certification, while in Mexico demand exceeded shipments and the album was unavailable after only one day of release. Four other singles were also released from the album: "No", "Día de Enero", "La Pared", and "Las de la Intuición". Fijación Oral, Vol. 1 has since sold over four million copies worldwide. On 8 February 2006, Shakira won her second Grammy Award with the win of Best Latin Rock/Alternative Album for Fijación Oral, Vol. 1. She received four Latin Grammy Awards in November 2006, winning the awards for Record of the Year, Song of the Year for "La Tortura", Album of the Year and Best Pop Vocal Album for Fijación Oral, Vol. 1.

The lead single for Shakira's seventh album, Oral Fixation, Vol. 2, "Don't Bother", failed to achieve chart success in the U.S. by missing the top 40 on the Hot 100. It did, however, reach the top 20 in most countries worldwide. Shakira's second English studio album and seventh studio album, Oral Fixation, Vol. 2, was released on 29 November 2005. The album debuted at number five on the Billboard 200, selling 128,000 copies in its first week. The album has gone on to sell 1.8 million records in the U.S., and over eight million copies worldwide.

Despite the commercial failure of the album's lead single in the U.S., it went on to spawn two more singles. "Hips Don't Lie", which featured Wyclef Jean, was released as the album's second single in February 2006. It would become Shakira's first number one single on the Billboard Hot 100, in addition to reaching number one in over 55 countries. Shakira and Wyclef Jean also recorded a Bamboo version of the song to serve as the closing ceremony song of the 2006 FIFA World Cup. Shakira later released the third and final single from the album, "Illegal", which featured Carlos Santana, in November 2006. She then embarked on the Oral Fixation Tour, which began in June 2006. The tour consisted of 125 shows between June 2006 and July 2007 and visited six continents. In February 2007, Shakira performed for the first time at the 49th Grammy Awards and earned the nomination for Best Pop Collaboration with Vocals for "Hips Don't Lie" with Wyclef Jean.

In late 2006, Shakira and Alejandro Sanz collaborated for the duet "Te lo Agradezco, Pero No", which is featured on Sanz's album El Tren de los Momentos. The song was a top ten hit in Latin America, and topped the Billboard Hot Latin Tracks chart. Shakira also collaborated with Miguel Bosé on the duet "Si Tú No Vuelves", which was released in Bosé's album Papito. In early 2007, Shakira worked with American R&B singer Beyoncé for the track "Beautiful Liar", which was released as the second single from the deluxe edition of Beyoncé's album B'Day. In April 2007, the single jumped 91 positions, from 94 to three, on the Billboard Hot 100 chart, setting the record for the largest upward movement in the history of the chart at the time. It was also number one on the official UK Singles Chart. The song earned them a Grammy Award nomination for Best Pop Collaboration with Vocals. Shakira was also featured on Annie Lennox's song "Sing", from the album Songs of Mass Destruction, which also features other 23 other female singers. In late 2007, Shakira and Wyclef Jean recorded their second duet, "King and Queen". The song was featured on Wyclef Jean's 2007 album Carnival Vol. II: Memoirs of an Immigrant.

Shakira wrote the lyrics, and jointly composed the music, for two new songs that are featured in the movie Love in the Time of Cholera, based on the acclaimed novel written by Colombian author Gabriel García Márquez. García Márquez himself asked Shakira to write the songs. The songs that Shakira lent to the soundtrack were "Pienso en ti", a song from Shakira's breakthrough album Pies Descalzos, "Hay Amores", and "Despedida". "Despedida" was nominated for Best Original Song at the 65th Golden Globe Awards.

2008–2010: She Wolf

In early 2008, Forbes named Shakira the fourth top-earning female artist in music industry. Then, in July of that year, Shakira signed a $300 million contract with Live Nation, which was to remain in effect for ten years. The touring group also doubles as a record label which promotes, but does not control, the music its artists release. Shakira's contract with Epic Records called for three more albums as well – one in English, one in Spanish, and a compilation, but the touring and other rights of the Live Nation deal were confirmed to begin immediately.

In January 2009, Shakira performed at the Lincoln Memorial "We Are One" festivities in honor of the inauguration of President Barack Obama. She performed "Higher Ground" with Stevie Wonder and Usher. She Wolf, was released in October 2009 internationally and on 23 November 2009 in the U.S. The album received mainly positive reviews from critics, and was included in AllMusic's year-end "Favorite Albums," "Favorite Latin Albums," and "Favorite Pop Albums" lists.
She Wolf reached number one on the charts of Argentina, Ireland, Italy, Mexico and Switzerland. It also charted inside the top five in Spain, Germany and the United Kingdom. It debuted at number fifteen on the Billboard 200. She Wolf was certified double-platinum in Colombia and Mexico, platinum in Italy and Spain, and gold in numerous countries including France and the United Kingdom. The album sold 2 million copies worldwide, becoming one of Shakira's least successful studio album to date in terms of sales.

In May, Shakira collaborated with the South African group Freshlyground to create the official song of the 2010 FIFA World Cup in South Africa. "Waka Waka (This Time for Africa)", which is based on a traditional Cameroonian soldiers's Fang song titled "Zangalewa" by the group Zangalewa or Golden Sounds. The single later reached the top 20 in Europe, South America and Africa and the top 40 in the U.S. and was performed by Shakira at the World Cup kick-off and closing. It became the biggest-selling World Cup song of all time.

2010–2015: Sale el Sol and Shakira
In October 2010, Shakira released her ninth studio album, titled Sale el Sol. The album received critical acclaim and was included in AllMusic's "Favorite Albums of 2010" and "Favorite Latin Albums of 2010" year-end lists. At the 2011 Latin Grammy Awards ceremony, Sale el Sol was nominated for "Album of the Year" and "Best Female Pop Vocal Album", winning the award in the latter category.
Commercially the album was a success throughout Europe and Latin America, Sale el Sol peaked atop the charts of countries Belgium, Croatia, France, Mexico, Portugal and Spain. In the United States, it debuted at number seven on the US Billboard 200 chart marking the highest debut for a Latin album for the year and was Shakira's fifth album to peak at number one. According to Billboard, 35% of its first-week sales were credited to strong digital sales. The album also peaked at number one on both the Top Latin Albums and Latin Pop Albums charts, achieving strong digital sales in the region.  The lead single, "Loca", was number one in many countries. The album had sold over 1 million copies worldwide in 6 weeks, and over 4 million since its release.

In September, Shakira embarked on The Sun Comes Out World Tour, in support of her two most recent albums. The tour visited countries in North America, Europe, South America, Asia, and Africa with 107 shows in all. The tour was met with positive reactions from critics, who praised Shakira's stage presence and energy during her performances. On 9 November 2011, Shakira was honored as Latin Recording Academy Person of the Year and performed a cover of Joe Arroyo's song "En Barranquilla Me Quedo" at the Mandalay Bay Events Center as a tribute to the singer, who had died earlier that year. In 2010 Shakira collaborated with rapper Pitbull for the song "Get It Started", which was slated to be the lead single from Pitbull's 2012 album, Global Warming. The single was released on 28 June 2012. She was also signed to Roc Nation under management purposes for her upcoming studio album.

On 17 September 2012, it was announced that Shakira and Usher would replace Christina Aguilera and CeeLo Green as coaches, for the fourth season of the U.S. TV show The Voice, alongside Adam Levine and Blake Shelton in March 2013. Shakira did not participate in the fifth season in September 2013 announcing that she would focus on her new album in the fall and would eventually return for the show's sixth season in February 2014.

Shakira originally planned to release her new album in 2012, but due to her pregnancy, plans to release the single and video were postponed.
In December 2013, it was announced that Shakira's new single had been delayed until January 2014.
Shakira's self-titled tenth studio album was later released on 25 March 2014. Commercially the album debuted at number two on the US Billboard 200 chart with first week sales of 85,000 copies. By doing so, Shakira became the singer's highest-charting album on the chart, although it also achieved her lowest first-week sales figure (for an English-language album).
The album spawned three singles.
After release the first two singles from the album, "Can't Remember to Forget You" and "Empire". RCA chose "Dare (La La La)" as third single. The World Cup version was officially released on 27 May to impact radio stations, features Brazilian musician Carlinhos Brown. On 13 July 2014, Shakira performed "La La La (Brazil 2014)" with Carlinhos Brown at the 2014 FIFA World Cup closing ceremony at the Maracanã Stadium. This performance became her third consecutive appearance at the FIFA World Cup.

2016–2020: El Dorado and Super Bowl LIV
Shakira began work on her eleventh studio album in the beginning of 2016. In May 2016, she collaborated with Colombian singer Carlos Vives on the track "La Bicicleta", which went to win the Latin Grammy Award for Record of the Year and Song of the Year. On 28 October 2016, Shakira released the single "Chantaje" with Colombian singer Maluma; though the song was a track from the upcoming eleventh studio album, it was not intended to be the lead single. The song became Shakira's most-viewed YouTube video, with over 2.1 billion views as of 1 June 2018. On 7 April 2017, Shakira released the song "Me Enamoré" as the second official single taken from her eleventh studio album El Dorado, which was released on 26 May 2017. She also released the song "Perro Fiel" featuring Nicky Jam as a promotional single for the album on 25 May 2017. Its official release as the third single took place on 15 September 2017, the same date its music video, which was filmed in Barcelona on 27 July 2017, was released. Before being released as a single, "Perro Fiel" was already certified as gold in Spain for selling over 20,000 copies on 30 August 2017.

In January 2018, Shakira won her third Grammy Award for Best Latin Pop Album for El Dorado, making her the only female Latin artist to do so. She then released "Trap", the fourth single off the album and her second collaboration with Maluma.

The El Dorado World Tour was announced on 27 June 2017, through Shakira's official Twitter account, and was slated to be sponsored by Rakuten. Other announced partners of the tour were Live Nation Entertainment's Global Touring Division (which had previously collaborated with Shakira on her The Sun Comes Out World Tour) and Citi, which the press release named as, respectively, the producer and the credit card for the North American leg of the tour.

The tour, it was announced, would begin on 8 November, in Cologne, Germany. But due to voice-strain related problems the singer experienced during her tour rehearsals, the date was cancelled one day before the original tour schedule, and it was announced that it would be rescheduled for a later date. On 9 November, for the same reason, she also announced the postponements to later dates, to be determined and announced, for both shows in Paris, as well as the following ones in Antwerp and Amsterdam. On 14 November, Shakira made an announcement, through her social networks, in which she revealed that she had suffered a haemorrhage on her right vocal cord in late October, at her last series of rehearsals, and that she thus needed to rest her voice for some time to recover; this forced the postponement of the tour's entire European itinerary to 2018.

The Latin American dates were expected to be announced later, when the tour resumed. There were plans to bring the tour, when it did resume, to countries such as the Dominican Republic. In addition, a journalist from the Brazilian edition of the Portuguese newspaper Destak announced, on his Twitter account, that the Colombian singer would visit Brazil the following March. However, according to the same newspaper, due to Shakira's hiatus to recover from her vocal-cord haemorrhage, the Latin American dates were also postponed to the second half of 2018. Eventually, Shakira did recover fully from the haemorrhage she had suffered and resumed her tour, performing in Hamburg, Germany on 3 June 2018.

In January 2018 she announced the dates for her El Dorado World Tour. She began the first leg of her tour in Europe, starting in Hamburg, Germany on 3 June and then ending in Barcelona, Spain on 7 July. She then spent a short time in Asia on the 11 and 13 July, after which she went to North America. She started her time there on 3 August in Chicago and finished in San Francisco on 7 September. Her tour dates for Latin America, started in Mexico City on 11 October and finished in Bogotá, Colombia on 3 November. Forbes ranked her among the world's highest-paid women in music in 2019, at number 10.

In February 2020, she and Jennifer Lopez performed for the Super Bowl LIV halftime show. According to Billboard, the halftime show had a viewership of 103 million people. On YouTube, it became the most viewed halftime show at that point in time. Shakira appeared in two television specials performing her songs during the COVID-19 pandemic, including Global Goal: Unite for Our Future (with "Sale el Sol") and The Disney Family Singalong: Volume II (with "Try Everything").

2021–present: Upcoming twelfth studio album and Dancing with Myself
In January 2021, Shakira sold her catalog of 145 songs to Hipgnosis Songs Fund. The company did not disclose the financial details of the sale.

On 16 July 2021, Shakira released a single titled "Don't Wait Up". On April 21, she released the song "Te Felicito" with singer Rauw Alejandro, as the lead single from her upcoming twelfth studio album. Shakira confirmed in May 2022 that work on the album was finished and it would be an electronic infused album with hints of urban and rock music. She was honored by the Ivors Academy in the United Kingdom with the Ivor Novello Awards' Special Award for Songwriting celebrating her songwriting in both English and Spanish and paving the way for Latin artists. By the end of that month, the dance reality competition show, Dancing with Myself, on which Shakira served as an executive producer and co-creator,along with Liza Koshy and Nick Jonaspremiered on NBC. On 11 January 2023, Shakira released "Shakira: Bzrp Music Sessions, Vol. 53" as a collaboration with Argentine DJ Bizarrap. On January 9, 2023, planes appeared in different cities with a banner that read: "Una loba como yo no está pa' tipos como tú 11/01/23" (A wolf like me is not for guys like you 11/01/23). What ended up being the preview of Bizarrap's new "session", which turned out to be highly mediatic because of its references to the end of her relationship with Gerard Piqué.

Artistry 
On her music, Shakira has said that, "my music, I think, is a fusion of many different elements. And I'm always experimenting. So I try not to limit myself, or put myself in a category, or... be the architect of my own jail." Shakira has frequently stated she is inspired by oriental music and Indian music, which influenced many of her earlier works. She has also been influenced by her Arab heritage, which was a major inspiration for her breakthrough world hit "Ojos Así". She told Portuguese TV, "Many of my movements belong to Arab culture." She also cites her parents as having been major contributors to her musical style. She is also strongly influenced by Andean music and South American folk music, using her native instrumentation for her Latin dance-pop songs.

Her earlier Spanish albums, including Pies Descalzos and Dónde Están los Ladrones? were a mix of folk music and Latin rock.
Her cross-over English album, Laundry Service and later albums were influenced by pop rock and pop Latino. "Laundry Service" is primarily a pop rock album, but also draws influences from a variety of musical genres. The singer credited this to her mixed ethnicity, saying: "I am a fusion. That's my persona. I'm a fusion between black and white, between pop and rock, between cultures – between my Lebanese father and my mother's Spanish blood, the Colombian folklore and Arab dance I love and American music."

The Arabian and Middle Eastern music elements that exerted a high influence on Dónde Están los Ladrones? are also present in Laundry Service, most prominently on "Eyes Like Yours"/"Ojos Así". Musical styles from different South American countries surface on the album. Tango, a style of fast-paced ballroom dance that originated in Argentina, is evident on "Objection (Tango)", which also combines elements of rock and roll. The uptempo track features a guitar solo and a bridge in which Shakira delivers rap-like vocals.

She Wolf is primarily an electropop album that combines influences from the musical styles of various countries and regions, like Africa, Colombia, India, and the Middle East. Shakira termed the album as a "sonic experimental trip", and said that she researched folk music from different countries in order to "combine electronics with world sounds, tambourines, clarinets, oriental and Hindu music, dancehall, etc."
Her 2010 album, Sale el Sol, is a return to her beginnings containing ballads, rock songs, and Latin dance songs like "Loca". In 2017, Deutsche Welles journalist Kate Müser commented on Shakira's "globalized sound": "[her] Latin beats, spiced with Middle Eastern and other world elements and made comfortably familiar by being churned through the pop machine, make you feel like a citizen of the world."

Influences 

As a child, Shakira was influenced by rock music, listening heavily to rock bands like Led Zeppelin, the Beatles, Nirvana, the Police and U2, while her other influences included Gloria Estefan, Madonna, Sheryl Crow, Alanis Morissette, Marc Anthony, Meredith Brooks and the Cure.

Dance
Shakira is well known for her dancing in her music videos and concerts. Her distinctive dancing style is said to combine Latin dancing with Middle Eastern belly dancing, which is derived from her Lebanese heritage, and her hip shaking is mentioned in songs, such as Fifth Harmony's "Brave Honest Beautiful". She is noted for usually employing minimal production, usually taking the stage with minimal makeup and natural hair, and without background dancers in her performances, preferring to focus on her vocals, dance moves, and stage presence. She often performs barefoot, a form of dance she learned as a young teen to overcome her shyness. She also mentioned in an MTV interview that she learned how to belly dance by trying to flip a coin with her belly.

Singing 
Shakira is a contralto and is known for her "unique and mesmerizing" singing voice which includes her "trademark" yodeling. Analyzing Shakira's cover of "Je l'aime à mourir", vocal teacher Beth Roars also noted Shakira's use of yodeling, explaining that there is "heaviness at the bottom of her tone" which "flips up" into "her head voice", as well as her ability to execute "complex melisma". She also noted Shakira's use of "Arabic scales", then stating that she uses "harmonic minor scales instead of pentatonic scales".

Legacy and impact

Shakira is a prominent figure in Latin music, commonly hailed as the 'Queen of Latin Music' for her successful crossover to the global market. The New York Times called her the "Titan of Latin Pop" for her unique and leading position in Latin music, saying: "Even as a new generation of Spanish-speaking artists are crossing over into American music's mainstream, Shakira's output stands alone." A similar comparative perspective was made by The Independent, who named Shakira an "International Phenom" for her global appeal and sales statistics, further elaborating with "To put her in perspective, other Latin exports such as Ricky Martin and Jennifer Lopez are mere minnows next to Shakira, both selling half the number of records she does". Forbes has deemed Shakira as "crossover phenom" for her unmatched success of crossover and one of the world's most powerful Latinas. Forbes further listed Shakira as one of the world's most powerful female celebrities. AllMusic's biographer Steve Huey described her as a "Wildly inventive diva who created a cross-cultural pop sound rooted in her native Colombia but encompassing nearly every territory in the world. [...] she wrote or co-wrote nearly all of her own material, and in the process gained a reputation as one of Latin music's most ambitiously poetic lyricists." Her unprecedented crossover has inspired other Latin American artists to attempt crossing over, one example is Mexican pop star Paulina Rubio, having MTV saying "there's no question that Shakira opened doors in this country for artists like Rubio to succeed." Similarly, Spin credits Shakira to have paved the way for other Latin artists to crossover, naming names like Maluma and J Balvin. After the crossover, her global and mainstream presence became big enough for Time magazine to call Shakira a "pop legend." She was marked as "one of the most influential artists of the 21st century" by ET.  Throughout her career, Shakira has earned several titles, including "The Crossover Queen" by The Economist, "The Queen of World Cup" by Billboard, and "Latin America's Pop Queen" by Pitchfork. Billboard has also noted that Shakira's music videos have "redefined the role of dancing in music videos", while listing her as the best Latin female music video artist of all time. The Middle Eastern newspaper El Correo del Golfo credits Shakira with "having opened the way" for several Hispanic singers today.

The authors of Reggaeton, published by Duke University Press, credited Shakira for popularizing the genre (reggaeton) in North America, Europe, and Asia, while the Public Broadcasting Service called her one of the three "most successful artists of the so-called Golden Age of Latin Music which reshaped America's cultural landscape for the twenty-first century".
Alongside her impact on Latin and mainstream pop culture, Shakira has also impacted popular culture in the Arab World due to her popularity in the region. In a publication titled Popular Culture in the Arab World: Arts, Politics, and the Media, author Andrew Hammond credits Shakira for impacting and shifting the images of Arab pop stars such as Moroccan Samira Said and Lebanese Nawal Al Zoghbi, saying "[they] have shifted their image and sound in attempt to follow in her (Shakira's) footsteps".

In 1999 Shakira's MTV Unplugged became the program's first episode to be broadcast entirely in Spanish  The concert is also noted to be the first time a Latin pop act attempted an Unplugged, as well as the first Latina solo act to do so. In 2001 Shakira's "Whenever Wherever" music video was aired on MTV with both the English and Spanish versions. According to a spokesman for the channel, this is noted as "the first time that U.S. MTV has aired a Spanish-language video." Following Daddy Yankee's "Gasolina" by five months, "La Tortura" was one of the first full Spanish-language music videos to air on MTV without an English version. In 2005, Sanz and Shakira performed "La Tortura" at the MTV Video Music Awards. In 2006 "Hips Don't Lie" was selected as one of the greatest songs by 21st century female artists by National Public Radio, ranked at number 65. "Waka Waka (This Time for Africa)" was named by Billboard the best and most commercially successful World Cup song. Published by the US Bureau of International Information Programs, the journal Global Issues (2006) cited Shakira as an example of a celebrity "in today's globalized world" who "made it big by sharing the uniqueness of their talent and culture with the global community." In 2020, The New Zealand Herald found Shakira's longevity in the industry "particularly impressive given her ability to breach the lines of crossover, a feat not many artists have been able to achieve." A similar remark was made by  Paper magazine, when writing about Shakira's longevity and her being one of the few pre-digital era artists to successfully crack the digital-streaming era of music, penning "[Shakira] is a titan in the digital era of music where she devours billions of streams with her catalog."

In 2010, Google revealed that Shakira was the most searched female entertainer of the year. In 2020, Shakira was the most Googled musician of the year.

In December 2021 Shakira was named by Kiss FM as one of the most influential female artists of the 21st century highlighting her achievements in the international market

Many artists have cited Shakira as an influence, including Beyoncé, Rihanna, Taylor Swift, Selena Gomez, Katy Perry, Will.i.am, Kylie Jenner, Lauren Jauregui, Christina Aguilera, Justin Bieber, Fergie, Maluma, Karol G, Camilo, Nicky Jam, Brie Larson, María Becerra, Dulce María, Anuel AA, Tini Stoessel, Ozuna, Natti Natasha, Rosalía, Carla Morrison, Ibeyi, Flo Milli, Manuel Turizo, Elena Rose, Francisca Valenzuela, Paloma Mami, Natalia Lafourcade, Kali Uchis, Ed Sheeran, Farina, Jbalvin, Lele Pons, Andres Cuervo, Li Yuchun, Prince Royce, Romeo Santos, Greeicy Rendon, Wendy Sulca, Anitta, Nathy Peluso, Britney Spears, Cardi B, Rita Ora, Vaness Wu, Gale, Sofia Reyes, Camila Cabello, Sebastian Yatra, Paty Cantú, Simone & Simaria, Becky G, Sasha Keable, Lola Indigo, Nora Fatehi, Kris Kross Ámsterdam, Bad Gyal, Jackson Wang and Ayra Starr.

Shakira has even received the admiration of intellectuals and writers such as Nobel Prize winner Gabriel García Márquez who has said "No one of any age can sing or dance with the innocent sensuality Shakira seems to have invented". Márquez wrote an essay exalting Shakira's "phenomenal musical talent", and "extraordinary maturity".

The newspaper El Correo del Golfo wrote that Shakira was the greatest exponent of Middle Eastern music in the West, citing her interest in Arabic music and dance.

Her influence has transcended the boundaries of pop culture, that she has become a socio-political influencer, and was named as one of the "World's Greatest Leaders" of 2017 by Fortune. The Guardian has written an extensive article about Shakira's impact on Colombia's social change, specifically in education, and her ability to discuss this issue with world leaders like Barack Obama, and Gordon Brown. Similarly The Independent has described Shakira as a "living proof that pop and politics mix" further noting that through her efforts and influence she is able to have "the ears of the global political elite".

Monuments
 In July 2018 Shakira visited Tannourine in Lebanon which is the village of her paternal grandmother. During her visit, she visited the Cedars Reserve in Tannourine where a square in the forest was named after her. The square holds the name "Shakira Isabelle Mebarak"

Achievements

Shakira has received numerous awards and recognition for her work. She is the recipient of three Grammy Awards and twelve Latin Grammy Awards—the most for a female artist. Shakira has sold more than 75 million records worldwide, making her one of world's best-selling music artists. By the time she released Laundry Service in 2001, she have already sold 10 million albums in Latin America according to Billboard. Three of her albums are among the best-selling Latin albums in the United States: Fijación Oral, Vol. 1 (8th), Dónde Están los Ladrones? (9th) and Pies Descalzos (23rd); she is the female artist with the highest number of best-selling Latin albums in the country. Fijación Oral, Vol. 1 became the best-selling Latin pop album and the second best-selling Latin album overall of the 2000's in the U.S. Dónde Están los Ladrones? is also one of the best-selling albums in Argentina, Chile, Colombia and Mexico; as well as Pies Descalzos is one of the best-selling albums in Brazil and Colombia.

Nielsen Broadcast Data Systems said that "Hips Don't Lie" was the most-played pop song in a single week in American radio history, being played 9,637 times in one week. This song makes Shakira the first artist in the history of the Billboard charts to reach the number-one spots on both the Top 40 Mainstream and a Latin chart in the same week. Additionally, she became the only artist from South America to reach the number-one spot on the U.S. Billboard Hot 100, the Australian ARIA chart, and the UK Singles Chart. Shakira is the female artist with most top-ten hits on the Billboards Hot Latin Songs chart (34). Her song "La Tortura" at one time held the chart's record for most weeks appearing at number-one, with a total of 25 non-consecutive weeks (this record is currently held by the Luis Fonsi song "Despacito" with 56 weeks). She is also the act with most number-one songs on the Latin Digital Song Sales chart (14) and the female artist with most number-one hits on the Latin Airplay chart (18).

Nokia stated in 2010, that there were more Shakira music downloads in the prior year than for any other Latino artist in the last five years, and She Wolf topped the Top 10 Latino downloads. In 2010, she was ranked number five on the 'Online Video's Most Viral Artists of 2010' with 404,118,932 views.
In 2011, Shakira was honored at the Latin Grammys as Latin Recording Academy Person of the Year, and by the Harvard Foundation as Cultural Rhythms Artist of the Year. She also received a star on the Hollywood Walk of Fame located at 6270 Hollywood Blvd. Originally, she was to be given a star on the Hollywood Walk of Fame in 2004, but she turned the offer down. In 2012, she received the honor of Chevalier De L'Ordre des Arts et des Lettres. In 2014, Shakira became the first musical act to perform three times at the FIFA World Cup. In the same year, Aleiodes shakirae, a new species of parasitic wasp was named after her because it causes its host to "shake and wiggle". Forbes ranked Shakira on their list of "Top 100 World's Most Powerful Women" at number 40 in 2012, at 52 in 2013, and at 58 in 2014. In 2015 Time recognized Shakira as one of the most influential people on social media. Shakira and Argentine president Cristina Fernández de Kirchner were the only Latin influencers named on the list. More so, Time noted that Shakira has an "unparalleled platform" on social media where she promotes her philanthropy. In 2008, Shakira was named as the Honorary Chair of the Global Campaign for Education Global Action Week.

In 2018, Spotify included Shakira in the list of the top 10 most streamed female artists of the decade on the platform, making her the highest streamed Latin artist. In 2020, Shakira became the first female artist to have 4 songs from different decades to have over 100 million streams on Spotify, also marking her as the only artist with Spanish songs, the only Latin artist, and third overall after Michael Jackson and Eminem to achieve this milestone. In the same year, she broke the Vevo Certified Awards record, and set it at 37, becoming the artist with the most videos with over 100 million views. She is now worth $300 million.

Other ventures
Shakira has ventured into many other businesses and industries. She acted in the Colombian telenovela El Oasis in 1994, playing the character of Luisa Maria.

Shakira began her own beauty line, "S by Shakira", with parent company Puig, in 2010.
Among the first perfumes it released included "S by Shakira" and "S by Shakira Eau Florale", along with lotions and body sprays. As of 2019, she has released 30 fragrances, not counting deluxe editions. On 17 September 2015, she was featured as a playable bird in the game Angry Birds POP! for a limited time, and also in a special tournament in the game Angry Birds Friends after a few weeks. On 15 October 2015, Love Rocks starring Shakira was the first video game that featured the pop star.

On 14 August 2015, at Disney's D23 Expo, it was announced that Shakira would play a character in the Disney animated movie Zootopia; in it, she would give voice to Gazelle, the biggest pop star in Zootopia. Shakira also contributed an original song to the film, titled "Try Everything", which was written and composed by Sia and Stargate. It opened to a record-breaking box office success in several countries and earned a worldwide gross of over $1 billion, making it the fourth highest-grossing film of 2016 and the 43rd highest-grossing film of all time.

In December 2021, it was announced that Shakira would be an executive producer for Dancing with Myself, an NBC dance competition series.

Philanthropy, humanitarian work and politics

In 1997, Shakira founded the Pies Descalzos Foundation, a Colombian charity with special schools for poor children all around Colombia. It was funded by Shakira and other international groups and individuals. The name of the foundation was taken from Shakira's third studio album, Pies Descalzos, which she released in 1995. The foundation's main focus is on aid through education, and the organization has five schools across Colombia that provide education and meals for 4,000 children.
On 27 April 2014 Shakira was honored with the Hero Award at the Radio Disney Music Awards for her Fundación Pies Descalzos work.

In 2005, Shakira became a founding member of Latin America in Solidarity Action, a coalition of artists and business leaders seeking to promote integrated early childhood public policies. In 2008, she served as the Honorary Chair of the Global Campaign for Education Global Action Week. Later, in 2010, she collaborated with the World Bank and the Barefoot Foundation to establish an initiative that distributes educational and developmental programs for children across Latin America.

Shakira is a UNICEF Goodwill Ambassador and is one of their global representatives. On 3 April 2006, Shakira was honored at a UN ceremony for creating the Pies Descalzos Foundation. In March 2010, she was awarded a medal by the UN International Labour Organization in recognition of being, as UN Labour Chief Juan Somavía put it, a "true ambassador for children and young people, for quality education and social justice". In November 2010, after performing as the opening act of the MTV European Music Awards, the Colombian singer also received the MTV Free Your Mind award for her continuing dedication to improve access to education for all children around the world.

In the Spanish edition of the magazine GQ, Shakira directed a few words to Sarkozy, "We are all gypsies". In the interview she made her viewpoint very clear: "What is happening now to them (the gypsies) will happen to our children and our children's children. We must turn to our citizens to act for the fundamental rights of human beings and condemn all that seems to us indictable", she declared.

In February 2011, the FC Barcelona Foundation and Pies descalzos reached an agreement for children's education through sport. Shakira was honored at the Latin Grammys as the Latin Recording Academy Person of the Year on 9 November 2011, for her philanthropy and contributions to Latin Music. Also in 2011, she was appointed by President Barack Obama to the President's Advisory Commission on Educational Excellence for Hispanics. The World Literacy Foundation announced Shakira as the recipient of the 2020 Global Literacy Award for "her significant contribution to the improvement of literacy for disadvantaged children around the world."

On 2 November 2018, during a visit to her birthplace, Barranquilla, for the construction of a school through her Barefoot Foundation (Pies Descalzos Foundation), Shakira spoke about the educational policies of the government under Ivan Duque (President of Colombia, 2018–2022). Speaking against the government's intentions to reduce the national education budget from 13% to 7%, she said, "This is unacceptable. It shows that instead of progressing forward we are moving backward. We need to invest more in education and we need to build more schools in places where there are none". She also talked about social inequality and unschooling. In 2020, Shakira was appointed by Prince William, Duke of Cambridge as a voters’ council member for the Earthshot prize which provides 50 environmental pioneers with the funds needed to further their work in tackling major problems impacting the environment. In May 2020, Shakira donated more than 50,000 face masks and ten respirators to combat the COVID-19 pandemic in her hometown of Barranquilla. During the 2021 Colombian protests, Shakira condemned the violence and asked President Iván Duque Márquez to "immediately stop the human rights violations" and "restitute the value of human life above any political interest."

Personal life
Shakira began a relationship with Argentine lawyer Antonio de la Rúa in 2000. In a 2009 interview, Shakira stated their relationship already worked as a married couple, and that "they don't need papers for that".

After 10 years together, Shakira and de la Rúa separated in August 2010 in what she described as "a mutual decision to take time apart from our romantic relationship". She wrote that the couple "view this period of separation as temporary", with de la Rúa overseeing Shakira's "business and career interests as he has always done". As first reported in September 2012, de la Rúa sued Shakira in April 2013, asking for $100 million he believed he was owed after Shakira suddenly terminated her business partnership with him in October 2011. His lawsuit was dismissed by a Los Angeles County Superior Court judge in August 2013.

Shakira entered a relationship with the Spanish football player Gerard Piqué in 2011. Piqué, who is exactly ten years her junior, and Shakira met in spring 2010 after he appeared in the music video for Shakira's song "Waka Waka (This Time for Africa)", the official song of the 2010 FIFA World Cup. Shakira gave birth to the couple's first son, Milan, on 22 January 2013 in Barcelona, where the family took residence. Shakira gave birth to their second son, Sasha, on 29 January 2015. Forbes listed Shakira and Piqué in their list of "World's Most Powerful Couples". In June 2022, the couple confirmed in a joint statement that they were separating after being together for 11 years.

In 2020, Shakira announced her completion of an ancient philosophy course through the University of Pennsylvania, describing it as an impractical hobby of hers.

Financial controversy
In November 2017, Shakira was named in the Paradise Papers. It was revealed that she was the sole shareholder of a Malta-based company which was being used to transfer $30 million in music rights. Her attorneys insisted that her use of the company was entirely legal.

In 2018, due at least in part to information revealed in the Paradise Papers, Spanish authorities began an investigation into Shakira's finances. Prosecutors argued that she did not pay taxes in Spain between 2012 and 2014, during which time she was living in Spain with Piqué and their family, while Shakira argued that she maintained her primary residence in the Bahamas during that period and otherwise was touring internationally. In July 2021, a Spanish judge ruled that there was "evidence of criminality" sufficient for Shakira to be brought to trial on charges of tax fraud.

In 2021, the Pandora Papers showed that Shakira submitted applications for three offshore companies in 2019. Her representatives told LaSexta that this paperwork was not filed for purposes of establishing new companies but as part of the process of dissolving existing companies. They further claimed that the companies had no income or activities and that Spanish authorities had been made aware of their existence.

In July 2022, after not reaching a deal with the Spanish Prosecution Ministry, the singer decided to go to trial to prove her innocence. The prosecutor asked the judge for an eight-year prison sentence over six alleged tax fraud crimes. On 27 September 2022, a Spanish judge from Esplugues de Llobregat approved the tax fraud trial after prosecutors accused her of failing to pay 14.5 million euros ($13.9 million) in taxes. Shakira claims she has already paid all she owed plus 3 million euros ($2.8 million) as interest. A trial date is now inevitable and the date will be set once the presiding Barcelona judge, Ana Duro, receives the necessary qualifying papers from both parties.

Discography

 Magia (1991)
 Peligro (1993)
 Pies Descalzos (1995)
 Dónde Están los Ladrones? (1998)
 Laundry Service (2001)
 Fijación Oral, Vol. 1 (2005)
 Oral Fixation, Vol. 2 (2005)
 She Wolf (2009)
 Sale el Sol (2010)
 Shakira (2014)
 El Dorado (2017)

Tours

 Pies Descalzos International Tour (1996–1997)
 Tour Anfibio (2000)
 Tour of the Mongoose (2002–2003)
 Oral Fixation Tour (2006–2007)
 The Sun Comes Out World Tour (2010–2011)
 El Dorado World Tour (2018)

Filmography

Television

Film

See also

 List of artists who reached number one in the United States
 List of artists who reached number one on the U.S. Dance Club Songs chart
 Best-selling international artists in Brazil
 List of highest-certified music artists in the United States
 List of best-selling music artists
 List of Billboard Social 50 number-one artists
 List of highest-certified music artists in the United States
 List of best-selling female music artists

Notes

References

Further reading
 VH1 Driven: Shakira (article)
 VH1 Driven: Shakira (video)
 
 Book: Woman Full of Grace by Ximena Diego
 
 Pareles, Jon (14 November 2005). "Shakira, from lip to hip". New Straits Times, p. L3.
 "Shakira pertahan orang Arab". (8 November 2005). Berita Harian, p. 13.
 Frank Cogan's review of Laundry Service for The Village Voice
 
 Chart Performance for "Don't Bother" from the Billboard Hot 100
 Chart Performance for Oral Fixation 2
 
 New York Times Magazine article on Shakira's philanthropic work on education.

External links

 
 
 
 

 
1977 births
Living people
20th-century Colombian women singers
21st-century Colombian actresses
21st-century Colombian women singers
Association footballers' wives and girlfriends
Belly dancers
Chevaliers of the Ordre des Arts et des Lettres
Colombian female dancers
Colombian film actresses
Colombian people of Italian descent
Colombian people of Lebanese descent
Colombian people of Spanish descent
Colombian people of Catalan descent
Colombian philanthropists
Colombian pop singers
Colombian record producers
Colombian rock singers
Colombian Roman Catholics
Colombian singer-songwriters
Colombian television actresses
Colombian voice actresses
Colombian women activists
Colombian women artists
Colombian women record producers
Colombian expatriates in Spain
Contraltos
Echo (music award) winners
English-language singers from Colombia
Grammy Award winners
Latin Grammy Award winners
Latin music songwriters
Latin pop singers
Latin Recording Academy Person of the Year honorees
MTV Europe Music Award winners
Judges in American reality television series
People from Barranquilla
RCA Records artists
Roc Nation artists
Sony Music Colombia artists
Sony Music Latin artists
UNICEF Goodwill Ambassadors
Women in Latin music
World Music Awards winners
People named in the Paradise Papers
People named in the Pandora Papers
Fifa World Cup ceremonies performers